KFC Kalná nad Hronom is a Slovak football team, based in the town of Kalná nad Hronom.

Current squad

Colours
Club colours are blue and red.

External links
Club website 
  
Club profile at Futbalnet.sk

References

Football clubs in Slovakia
Association football clubs established in 1920
1920 establishments in Slovakia